AllAfrica is a website that aggregates news produced primarily on the African continent about all areas of African life, politics, issues and culture. It is available in both English and French and produced by AllAfrica Global Media, which has offices in Cape Town, Dakar, Lagos, Monrovia, Nairobi, and Washington, D.C. AllAfrica is the successor to the African News Service.

Its stories can be displayed by categories and subcategories such as country, region, and by news topic. In 2008, AllAfrica rolled out a comment board system.

The President of AllAfrica Global Media, Amadou Mahtar Ba, is a member of the International Advisory Board of the African Press Organization.

References

External links 
 
 ReliefWeb archives of AllAfrica
 NAACP archives of AllAfrica

South African news websites
Africa-focused media